The Springfield Fame were a men's spring-professional basketball team in the United States Basketball League from Springfield, Massachusetts, the hometown of the Naismith Memorial Basketball Hall of Fame, which gave the inspiration of the team name.

History
The Springfield Fame were founded in 1985. In their inaugural season, they finished with a record of 19-6 and were the first USBL Champions. The league did not add a playoff system until the 1987 season. In their second season, the Fame made national headlines by signing 27-year-old women's basketball legend Nancy Lieberman. Lieberman thus became the first female basketball player to play regular season minutes in a men's pro league. They would finish second with a 23–10 record and 0.5 game behind the Tampa Bay Flash. The Fame would fold following the 1986 season.

Season-by-season records

Team awards
USBL Player of the Year
Tracy Jackson (1985)

USBL Coach of the Year
Gerald Oliver (1985)
Henry Bibby (1986)

All-USBL Teams

First Team
Tracy Jackson (1985)
Billy Goodwin (1986)

Second Team
Larry Lawrence (1985)
Michael Adams (1985 and 1986)
Jerome Henderson (1986)

USBL All-Rookie Team
Andre Goode (1985)
Michael Adams (1985)
Dominic Pressley (1986)

USBL All-Defensive Team
Michael Adams (1985 and 1986)
Jerome Henderson (1986)

References

United States Basketball League teams
Basketball teams in Springfield, Massachusetts